Esfandiar Lari (born 3 February 1939) is an Iranian sports shooter. He competed in the mixed skeet event at the 1976 Summer Olympics.

References

1939 births
Living people
Iranian male sport shooters
Olympic shooters of Iran
Shooters at the 1976 Summer Olympics
Place of birth missing (living people)